= Shehu Aliyu Yemmedi =

Nigeria Politician

Member of the House of Representatives
- In office From 1999 to 2003 – 2003 to 2007
- Constituency: Kano state

Personal details
- Born: Kano State
- Occupation: Politician

Shehu Aliyu Yemmedi is a Nigerian politician from Kano State who represented the Karaye/Rogo constituency in the House of Representatives at the National Assembly. He was initially elected in 1999, serving until 2003, and then re-elected in 2003, holding office until 2007 as a member of the People's Democratic Party (PDP). He was succeeded by Ahmad Audi Zarewa in 2007.

== Early life and education ==
Shehu Aliyu Yemmedi was born in January 1969 in Kano State, Nigeria.

== Career ==
He served as a member of Nigeria's National Assembly, representing the House of Representatives from 1999 to 2003 and again from 2003 to 2007. He was preceded by Shehu Ahmed A. and succeeded by Ahmad Audi Zarewa after finishing his term in 2007.
